Betty Louke Chelain  is a Ugandan politician and female member of parliament. In 2021, she was elected as a female representative in parliament for Amudat district.

She is a member of the ruling National Resistance Movement political party. In the 11th parliament, Betty serves on the Committee on Health.

See also 
 List of members of the eleventh Parliament of Uganda.
Amudat District.
National Resistance Movement
Parliament of Uganda.

References

External links 
 Website of the Parliament of Uganda

National Resistance Movement politicians
Women members of the Parliament of Uganda
Members of the Parliament of Uganda
Living people
Ugandan Roman Catholics
21st-century Ugandan women politicians
21st-century Ugandan politicians
Amudat District
Year of birth missing (living people)